Ryu Yoon-Sik (Hangul: 류윤식; born ) is a South Korean volleyball player. He competed at the 2017 FIVB World League as part of the South Korea men's national volleyball team. On club level he plays for the Seoul Woori Card Wibee.

References

External links
 profile at FIVB.org

1989 births
Living people
South Korean men's volleyball players
Place of birth missing (living people)
People from Seongnam
Sportspeople from Gyeonggi Province
21st-century South Korean people